Ryusei Ashizawa is a Japanese kickboxer. 

Between April and July 2022, he was ranked the tenth best bantamweight in the world by Combat Press.

Kickboxing career
Ashizawa made his professional debut on December 9, 2012 at MAJKF BREAK－32 ～SEIZE～. He defeated Tetsuro Noguchi by unanimous decision to take the MAJKF Japan rookie tournament title.

On November 11, 2013, Ashizawa faced Kenshiro Aoi in Japan Kickboxing Innovation. He won the fight by technical knockout in the second round to earn a shot at the reigning REBELS champion Hikaru Machida. They faced each other on December 23 at Japan Kickboxing Innovation "champion carnival". He lost the fight by technical knockout in the fourth round.

On August 31, 2014 Ashizawa challenged Kyohei for the Innovation Super Featherweight title. He lost the fight by unanimous decision.

On December 12, 2015 Ashizawa faced Sota Ichinohe at Japan Kickboxing Innovation Champion's Carnival 2015. He lost the fight by unanimous decision after five rounds.

On April 29, 2016 Ashizawa faced Atom Yamada for the vacant Innovation Featherweight title at Japan Kickboxing Innovation "Dream Force-11". He won the fight by technical knockout in the second round with punches and captured the vacant belt.

On April 16, 2017, Ashizawa faced Kazuki Koyano at REBELS 50. He won the fight by knockout in the third round with punches.

On May 28, 2017, Ashizawa lost to Tatsuya Oiwa by split decision at Krush 76.

On December 27, 2017, Ashizawa faced Yuta Murakoshi at K-1 World GP 2017 Japan Survival Wars 2017. He lost the fight by majority decision.

On June 17, 2018, Ashizawa entered an 8-man one night tournament for the vacant K-1 featherweight title at K-1 World GP 2018: 2nd Featherweight Championship Tournament. In Quarter Finals he defeated Silviu Vitez by knockout in the first round. In the semi finals he lost Haruma Saikyo by unanimous decision.

Ashizawa faced Jorge Varela at K-1 World GP 2019: K’FESTA 2 on March 10, 2019. He lost the fight by first-round knockout, Ashizawa was floored with a left hook near the end of the opening round.

Ashizawa was scheduled to face Kotaro Shimano at K-1 World GP 2020 in Tokyo. Ashizawa won the bout by TKO in the second round after a back and forth fight in which both Ashizawa and Shimano were knocked down.

Ashizawa fought Yuta Murakoshi at the K-1: K'Festa 4 Day 1 event, and lost the fight by unanimous decision.

Ashizawa was scheduled to face Hirotaka Urabe at K-1 World GP 2021: Yokohamatsuri on September 20, 2021. He won the fight by unanimous decision.

Ashizawa faced YA-MAN at THE MATCH 2022 on June 19, 2022, in a open finger glove match. He lost the fight by a first-round knockout, after suffering several knockdowns.

Titles and accomplishments
Martial Arts Japan Kickboxing Federation
 2012 MAJKF Rookie Tournament Featherweight Winner

Japan Kickboxing Innovation
 2016 Innovation Featherweight Champion

Fight record

|-  style="text-align:center; background:#"
| 2023-04-01 || ||align=left| Kouzi || Rizin 41 – Osaka || Osaka, Japan || ||  ||

|-  style="text-align:center; background:#fbb"
| 2022-06-19 || Loss||align=left| YA-MAN || THE MATCH 2022 || Tokyo, Japan || KO (Right hook)|| 1 ||1:49

|-  style="text-align:center; background:#cfc;"
| 2022-02-27 || Win ||align=left| Narufumi Nishimoto || K-1 World GP 2022 Japan || Tokyo, Japan || KO (3 Knockdown) || 2 || 1:58

|-  style="text-align:center; background:#cfc;"
| 2021-09-20 || Win ||align=left| Hirotaka Urabe || K-1 World GP 2021: Yokohamatsuri || Yokohama, Japan || Decision (Unanimous) || 3 ||  3:00

|-  style="background:#fbb;"
| 2021-03-21|| Loss || align=left| Yuta Murakoshi || K-1: K'Festa 4 Day 1 || Tokyo, Japan || Decision (Unanimous) || 3||3:00

|-  style="background:#cfc;"
| 2020-12-13|| Win || align=left| Kotaro Shimano || K-1 World GP 2020 Winter's Crucial Bout|| Tokyo, Japan || KO (Punches) || 2 || 3:00

|-  style="background:#fbb;"
| 2019-06-30 || Loss||align=left| Tatsuya Oiwa || K-1 World GP 2019: Super Bantamweight World Tournament || Tokyo, Japan|| Decision (Unanimous) || 3 || 3:00

|-  style="background:#fbb;"
| 2019-03-10|| Loss ||align=left| Jorge Varela || K-1 World GP 2019: K’FESTA 2 || Saitama, Japan || KO (Left hook) || 1 || 2:41

|-  style="text-align:center; background:#fbb;"
| 2018-11-03|| Loss ||align=left| Hirotaka Urabe || K-1 World GP 2018: 3rd Super Lightweight Championship Tournament || Saitama, Japan || KO (Right Hook) || 3 || 2:28

|-  style="background:#cfc;"
| 2018-09-24|| Win ||align=left| Kaito Ozawa || K-1 World GP 2018: inaugural Cruiserweight Championship Tournament|| Saitama, Japan || Decision (Unanimous) || 3 || 3:00

|-  style="background:#fbb;"
| 2018-06-17 || Loss || align=left| Haruma Saikyo || K-1 World GP 2018: 2nd Featherweight Championship Tournament, Semi Finals || Saitama, Japan || Decision (Unanimous) || 3 || 3:00

|-  style="background:#cfc;"
| 2018-06-17 || Win|| align=left| Silviu Vitez || K-1 World GP 2018: 2nd Featherweight Championship Tournament, Quarter Finals || Saitama, Japan || TKO (Ref. Stoppage/Punches) || 1 || 1:28

|-  style="background:#cfc;"
| 2018-03-10|| Win ||align=left| Tenma Sano || Krush.86 || Tokyo, Japan || Decision (Majority) || 3 || 3:00

|-  style="background:#fbb;"
| 2017-12-27|| Loss ||align=left| Yuta Murakoshi || K-1 World GP 2017 Japan Survival Wars 2017 || Tokyo, Japan || Decision (Majority)|| 3 || 3:00

|-  style="background:#cfc;"
| 2017-10-14|| Win ||align=left| Ippei Kawano || KHAOS 4 || Tokyo, Japan || Decision (Unanimous) || 3 || 3:00

|-  style="background:#fbb;"
| 2017-08-06 || Loss ||align=left| Shoya Masumoto || Krush 78 || Tokyo, Japan|| Decision (Unanimous) || 3 || 3:00

|-  style="background:#fbb;"
| 2017-05-28 || Loss ||align=left| Tatsuya Oiwa || Krush 76 || Tokyo, Japan|| Decision (Split) || 3 || 3:00

|-  style="background:#cfc;"
| 2017-04-16|| Win ||align=left| Kazuki Koyano || REBELS 50 || Tokyo, Japan || KO (Punches) || 3 || 1:19

|-  style="background:#cfc;"
| 2017-03-18|| Win ||align=left| Ryuta Manabe || KHAOS 1 || Tokyo, Japan || KO (Middle kick) || 3 || 1:50

|-  style="background:#c5d2ea;"
| 2016-09-19|| Draw ||align=left| Kento Ito ||K-1 World GP 2016 Super Featherweight World Tournament || Tokyo, Japan || Decision || 3 || 3:00

|-  style="background:#cfc;"
| 2016-04-29|| Win ||align=left| Atom Yamada || JAPAN KICKBOXING INNOVATION "Dream Force-11" || Tokyo, Japan || TKO (Ref.stoppage/Punches) || 2 || 2:09
|-
! style=background:white colspan=9 |

|-  style="background:#fbb;"
| 2015-12-12|| Loss ||align=left| Sota Ichinohe || JAPAN KICKBOXING INNOVATION "Champion's Carnival 2015" || Tokyo, Japan || Decision (Unanimous)|| 5 || 3:00

|-  style="background:#cfc;"
| 2015-08-30|| Win ||align=left| Junpei Rogi|| SNKA "WINNERS 2015 3rd" || Tokyo, Japan || KO|| 3 || 1:32

|-  style="background:#cfc;"
| 2015-05-31|| Win ||align=left| Yasuhiko Abe|| JAPAN KICKBOXING INNOVATION "Sentou Kai 16" || Tokyo, Japan || TKO (Knee)|| 1 || 2:57

|-  style="background:#cfc;"
| 2015-04-26|| Win ||align=left| Kenta Yagami || JAPAN KICKBOXING INNOVATION "Dream Force－7" || Tokyo, Japan || Decision (Majority) || 3 ||3:00 

|-  style="background:#cfc;"
| 2014-12-28|| Win ||align=left| Masashi Ochiai || Shuken 23 Joe Tsuchiya Festival || Shizuoka, Japan || KO || 1 || 

|-  style="background:#cfc;"
| 2014-11-09|| Win ||align=left| Ouji || JAPAN KICKBOXING INNOVATION "Sentou Kai 15" || Tokyo, Japan || TKO (Referee stoppage)|| 1 || 1:02

|-  style="background:#fbb;"
| 2014-08-31|| Loss ||align=left| Kyohei || JAPAN KICKBOXING INNOVATION "Ikazuchi Mai" || Matsuyama, Japan || Decision (Unanimous)|| 5|| 3:00
|-
! style=background:white colspan=9 |

|-  style="background:#fbb;"
| 2014-05-18|| Loss ||align=left| Takuma || JAPAN KICKBOXING INNOVATION "Sentou Kai 14" || Tokyo, Japan || TKO (Doctor stoppage)|| 2|| 2:51

|-  style="background:#fbb;"
| 2013-12-23|| Loss ||align=left| Hikaru Machida || JAPAN KICKBOXING INNOVATION "Innovation champion carnival"  || Tokyo, Japan || TKO (Ref. Stoppage/Punches)|| 4 || 1:23

|-  style="background:#cfc;"
| 2013-11-13|| Win ||align=left| Kenshiro Aoi || JAPAN KICKBOXING INNOVATION "Sentou Kai 13" || Tokyo, Japan || TKO (Corner stoppage)|| 1 || 2:32

|-  style="background:#cfc;"
| 2013-05-19|| Win ||align=left| Ashura || JAPAN KICKBOXING INNOVATION "Sentou Kai 12" || Tokyo, Japan || Decision (Unanimous)|| 3 || 3:00

|-  style="background:#cfc;"
| 2013-02-24|| Win ||align=left| Hiroshi SaenchaiGym || NJKF MuayThaiOpen 23 || Tokyo, Japan || TKO|| 2 || 2:55

|-  style="background:#cfc;"
| 2012-12-09|| Win ||align=left| Tetsuro Noguchi || MAJKF BREAK－32 ～SEIZE～ || Tokyo, Japan || Decision (Unanimous) || 3 || 3:00
|-
! style=background:white colspan=9 |

|-
| colspan=9 | Legend:

See also
List of male kickboxers

References

1995 births
Living people
Japanese male kickboxers
Bantamweight kickboxers